YouTube (formerly YouTube Spotlight) is YouTube's official YouTube channel for spotlighting videos and events on the platform. Events shown on the channel include YouTube Comedy Week and the YouTube Music Awards. Additionally, the channel uploaded annual installments of YouTube Rewind between 2010 and 2019. For a brief period in late 2013, the channel was ranked as the most-subscribed on the platform. As of December 2021, the channel has earned 32.6 million subscribers and 2.5 billion video views.

History 
The YouTube channel was registered on Feb 1, 2005. On November 2, 2013, the YouTube channel briefly surpassed PewDiePie's channel, to become the most-subscribed channel on the website. The channel ascended to the top position through auto-suggesting and pre-selecting itself as a subscription option upon new user registration for YouTube. Throughout December 2013, the channel and PewDiePie struggled for the top position, but soon PewDiePie secured it on December 23, 2013.

Videos

YouTube Rewind 

Between 2010 and 2019, YouTube released an annual YouTube Rewind video through its Spotlight channel. All YouTube Rewind videos from 2012 to 2018 have surpassed 100 million views, while YouTube Rewind: The Ultimate 2016 Challenge surpassed 200 million views. YouTube Rewind 2010: Year in Review and YouTube Rewind 2011, however, have less than 10 million views each. The Ultimate 2016 Challenge became YouTube's fastest video to reach 100 million views, doing so in just 3.2 days. It is also the eighth most-liked non-music video of all time with over 3.40 million likes. On December 14, 2016, shortly after The Ultimate 2016 Challenge was released, the Spotlight channel surpassed 1 billion total video views. On December 12, 2018, approximately 6 days and 10 hours after upload, YouTube Rewind 2018: Everyone Controls Rewind became YouTube's most-disliked video of all time, surpassing Justin Bieber's Baby. Shortly after, it also became the first YouTube video to reach 10 million dislikes, doing so in 6 days and 12 hours. Everyone Controls Rewind currently sits at 17 million dislikes. YouTube Rewind 2019: For the Record quickly garnered a notably negative like/dislike ratio as well, amassing 3.9 million dislikes in under 24 hours since its release on December 5, 2019. It is currently the third most disliked YouTube video with over 8.8 million dislikes.

YouTube Nation 
In January 2014, YouTube Nation was launched on its own channel, as a collaborative project between YouTube and DreamWorks Animation. DWA oversaw the production while YouTube managed the sales and marketing of the series. The series is a news series that rounds up information from the Spotlight channel. YouTube promotes the series through its Spotlight channel, as well. Early in its history, the series used guest hosts Grace Helbig, Hannah Hart, and Mamrie Hart (no relation) to help propel the series and its audience.

Due to regularly being promoted on the Spotlight channel (now just called YouTube), YouTube Nation was able to reach the 1 million subscriber milestone within three months of its launch. The series was nominated for the fourth annual Streamy Award under Best News and Current Events but lost to SourceFed. After 350 episodes, the series aired its last episode on December 5, 2014.

Hello 2021 

On December 10, 2020, YouTube announced that Fremantle would produce Hello 2021—a series of five localized New Year's Eve countdown specials that will celebrate notable videos of the year, and feature other guest appearances and performances. There will be separate specials for Japan, South Korea, India, the UK, and the Americas.

Events

Themed week events 
In May 2013, the Spotlight channel was being used to stream its Comedy Week event, produced by ChannelFlip. During the event, YouTube used its homepage to spotlight comedy videos made specifically for that the event. The video of the 2-hour kickoff event has earned 1.06 million views as of September 2014. The event was met with mixed critical reception, with  the particular mixture of new and traditional media personalities, as well as technical difficulties being specifically scrutinized. The event was the first of its kind in relation to being streamed by YouTube. Although it was marketed as the first annual Comedy Week event, there have been no announcements in regards to a follow-up Comedy Week event.

On August 4, 2013, YouTube launched "Geek Week", which was kicked off by Freddie Wong in the United States, and TomSka in the United Kingdom. The week was composed of themed days, which included Blockbuster Sunday, Global Geekery Monday, Brainiac Tuesday, Super Wednesday, Gaming Thursday, and Fan Friday. The event was launched in conjunction with Nerdist in the US, and ChannelFlip in the UK.

#ProudToLove 
During the 2013 LGBT Pride Month, the channel was used to bring light to LGBT and LGBT pride-related information and videos. Google, which owns YouTube, has been documented to be "a huge proponent of gay rights". An article on the Official YouTube Blog was attached to the event.

YouTube Music Awards 

In November 2013, YouTube launched its first YT Music Awards presentation. Announcing its nominations in the previous month, the award show aimed to create traffic through its social media voting format. The event was streamed onto the Spotlight channel, and has earned over 4.5 million views as of September 2014. The event's technical difficulties and its plethora of nominations for mainstream artists, rather than YouTube artists, were at the center of overall mixed critical reception.

References

External links 
 

Number-one YouTube channels in subscribers
YouTube channels launched in 2005
YouTube channels
YouTube